Alycia Dias is a Pakistani playback singer, who is best known for singing the Urdu language serials. Her career began with her participation in the reality show LG Awaaz Banaye Star, where she became the semi-finalist at the age of 17. She made her debut as a lead vocalist by singing the title song of the 2013 Turkish serial Noor in Urdu language. She has won Hum Award for Best Original Soundtrack for her song "Dil-e-Muztar" for the 2013 romantic drama Dil-e-Muztar that aired on Hum TV.

Career 
Dias started her career with LG Awaaz Banaey Star, where she won the contest at the age of 17. She started her playback singing career with the songs "Tum Hi Ho" and "Aag", which she sang with the band The Milestones. She then sang the theme song of Urdu dubbed Turkish serial Noor,  which aired on Geo TV. After this, she sang the theme song of Daagh aired on ARY Digital, which was also her debut OST for a television drama. She also sang the song "Yahan Zindagi Bhi Fareb Hai" for the serial Fareb on Express Entertainment. Her next song was for the Geo TV series Nanhi. Dias won the Best Original Soundtrack at the Hum Awards for singing the title song for the Hum TV's romantic serial Dil-e-Muztar, and later sang the title song of the serial Intikam, which was aired on Geo Kahani. Alycia next sang the song of Shukk with Nabeel Shaukat Ali which aired on ARY Digital. She also sang the soundtrack of the serial Pachtawa with Nabeel Shaukat Ali.

Alycia started her solo career with a single Sahara, which was released in 2016. Alycia was also one of the 48 musicians who rerecorded the National Anthem of Pakistan, re-visioned by Rohail Hyatt.

Reality show 
2007 LG Awaaz Banaey Star as Contestant—Semi Finalist (Eliminated)

Discography 
 2012 "Tum Hi Ho" and "Aag"—Performed with The Milestones

All Soundtracks

Singles 

 Nadaniyaan
 Hawa Feat. Alex Shahbaz
 Bewafa
 Na Jaane 
 Jhoomlay 
 O Holy Night 
 Sahara 
 Hum Azad Hain 
 Tanhayi Feat. Vahaj Hanif 
 Nadaniyaan
 Tu Mera Nahi
 Khushfehmiyan Feat. Raafay Israr

OSTs 

 Dil E Muztar 
 Saaya 2 
 Dil Nawaz
 Chalawa
 Mah-e-Tamaam
 Ye Kahani Kyun Adhoori Hai 
 Main Lut Gayee Bulleya 
 Ki Jaana Mein Kaun 
 Iltija 
 Umm-e-Haniya
 Kirchi Kirchi Joda Jeeva 
 Woh Bhi Bus Chup Rehti Thi
 Ishq Barra Beymaan Hai
 Yeh Tamam Zindagi Daagh Hai

Intezaar - Extended Play (EP)  

 Intezaar

Coke Studio 
Alycia Dias appeared in Coke Studio (Pakistani season 8) and performed Sohni Dharti with various artists, and Armaan with the Band Siege.

Albums 
Alycia Dias released her debut album, Intezaar in 2022.  The album is produced and composed by Alex Shahbaz.

References

External links 

Alycia Dias on Facebook
Alycia Dias Official YouTube Channel 
Alycia Dias on Spotify

Singers from Karachi
1992 births
Living people
Pakistani people of Goan descent
Pakistani Roman Catholics
21st-century Pakistani women singers
St Joseph's Convent School, Karachi alumni
Pakistani playback singers
Pakistani women singer-songwriters